Mateusz Lucjan Bernatek (born 12 January 1994) is a Polish Greco-Roman wrestler. He won the silver medal in the 66 kg event at the 2017 World Wrestling Championships held in Paris, France. He is also a silver medalist at the 2021 European Wrestling Championships.

Career 

In 2015, he represented Poland at the European Games in the 66 kg event without winning a medal. Four years later, he also competed in the 67 kg event at the 2019 European Games held in Minsk, Belarus.

In 2021, he won one of the bronze medals in the 72 kg event at the Grand Prix Zagreb Open held in Zagreb, Croatia. In 2022, he won one of the bronze medals in his event at the Vehbi Emre & Hamit Kaplan Tournament held in Istanbul, Turkey. He competed in the 67 kg event at the European Wrestling Championships in Budapest, Hungary.

Achievements

References

External links 
 

Living people
1994 births
Place of birth missing (living people)
Polish male sport wrestlers
European Wrestling Championships medalists
Wrestlers at the 2015 European Games
Wrestlers at the 2019 European Games
European Games competitors for Poland
World Wrestling Championships medalists
20th-century Polish people
21st-century Polish people